Yunying (1913–1992), better known as Jin Yunying, was a Chinese princess of Manchu descent. She was the daughter of Zaifeng (Prince Chun) and Youlan, and a younger sister of Puyi, the Last Emperor of China. She was married to Runqi, the younger brother of Puyi's first wife, Wanrong.

Names
Yunying's original family name was Aisin Gioro; she is referred to as "Yunying" because Manchus were usually referred to by their given names only. Like other members of the Aisin Gioro family (e.g. her brother Puren (Jin Youzhi)), she changed her family name to Jin, which means "gold" in the Chinese language just like "Aisin" in the Manchu language.

Yunying's courtesy name, Ruixiu, was given to her by her father, Zaifeng. Her art name, Binghao, was given to her by her brother, Puyi. She is also sometimes referred to as Jin Ruixiu.

Reginald Johnston, the Scottish academic and diplomat who tutored Puyi, gave Yunying an English name, Lily.

Life

Early life
Yunying was born in the Manchu Aisin Gioro clan in 1913 as the third daughter of Zaifeng (Prince Chun) and his primary consort, Youlan. She was also a full sister of Puyi, the Last Emperor of China. She had three other full siblings (one brother and two sisters) apart from Puyi, and six half siblings (two brothers and four sisters). By the time of her birth, the Manchu-led Qing dynasty had already been overthrown by the Xinhai Revolution and her brother, Puyi, who was still a child then, had been forced to abdicate. However, the former imperial family were still allowed to live in the Forbidden City, where Yunying was born. She was referred to as "Third Princess" (三格格) in her childhood and was Puyi's favourite sister. In November 1924, the warlord Feng Yuxiang took control of Beijing and forced Puyi and his family out of the Forbidden City. They moved to Tianjin's Heping District. In Tianjin, Yunying and her siblings learned the Japanese language and played tennis.

Life in Manchuria

When Yunying turned 19, Puyi arranged for her to be married to Runqi (潤麒) of the Gobulo (郭布羅) clan. Runqi was the younger brother of Wanrong, Puyi's empress. In 1931, Puyi was installed as the emperor of Manchukuo, a puppet state established by the Empire of Japan in northeastern China. Yunying and Runqi were married in Hsinking (present-day Changchun, Jilin), the capital of Manchukuo. About a month after the wedding, Puyi sent Runqi, Pujie and Yunying to Japan for studies. When Yunying arrived in Japan, she was immediately approached by members of the Japanese imperial family, who wanted her to serve as the honorary president of the women's association. One of the Shōwa Emperor's sisters-in-law also specially invited her to their residence to teach them the Chinese language. Yunying felt lonely during her stay in Japan, so she often wrote to Puyi. Puyi had their letters compiled into a book. In 1933, Yunying returned to Hsinking to visit her family and decided to remain in China. Runqi accompanied her and served in Manchukuo as an instructor in a military school.

Later life
At the end of the Second Sino-Japanese War in 1945, Soviet forces invaded and occupied northeastern China. Yunying and the rest of Puyi's family were evacuated by train from Hsinking to Dalizigou (in present-day Linjiang, Jilin); Puyi, along with two of his sisters, his brothers, three nephews, his physician and a servant, took a plane to Mukden (present-day Shenyang, Liaoning), where he was arrested and taken to a prison camp in Siberia. Runqi was also taken prisoner and was not released until 1957. Yunying, left with only a few sets of clothing, brought her three children with her to Tonghua. During this time, she supported herself and her children by collecting and selling used clothes at a tobacco stand on the streets. During this time, she was taken captive and publicly interrogated about her life. She was released later and allowed to return to Tonghua.

In 1949, after Chinese Communist forces occupied Beijing, Yunying and her three children were allowed to return to Beijing to reunite and live with her family members. In 1951, after the death of her father, Prince Chun, Yunying inherited part of his property and managed to make a living through collecting rental fees. Since then, she had been actively involved in subdistrict affairs in her neighbourhood, and was later nominated by the residents to be the subdistrict representative. As a politician, she often spoke for the new marriage law.

In 1954, Zhang Shizhao, the president of the Central Research Institute of Culture and History, chanced upon the book containing the letters exchanged between Yunying and Puyi. With help from Yunying's uncle, Zaitao, Zhang Shizhao contacted Yunying and asked her to write an autobiography, which he then presented to Mao Zedong. After reading Yunying's autobiography, Mao commented, "A person who enters society becomes someone with aspirations." He then sent the autobiography to Zhou Enlai for him to read too. Shortly after, Yunying was appointed as a delegate representing Beijing's Dongcheng District in the Chinese People's Political Consultative Conference. In 1956, with permission from Mao Zedong, Yunying and Zaitao travelled to the Fushun War Criminals Management Centre to visit Puyi, who was detained there as a war criminal.

Yunying died in China in 1992. She was survived by her three children: Zongyan (宗弇), Zongguang (宗光) and Manruo (曼若). Her husband, Runqi was the owner of a small clinic that treated gynecological diseases and nervous disorders and was interviewed by The New York Times in 2000.  He died in 2007.

Relationship with Puyi
Yunying was described as beautiful and goodhearted. In his memoirs, Puyi described Yunying as spoiled and idle and interested in pointless matters during the Manchukuo period, foremost to be in his favour: when he gave a gift to another member of the family, Yunying wished to be given the same. According to Puyi, Yunying later said about this period in her life: "What was I before, but an ornament?"

Ancestry

Gallery

Notes

References
 Puyi (Swedish): Jag var kejsare av Kina (I was the emperor of China) (1988)
 https://web.archive.org/web/20110927064301/http://www.lijiazhang.com/downloads/files/life_after_the_last_emperor.pdf
 https://web.archive.org/web/20100831103347/http://fineartimports.com/imperial.htm

1913 births
1992 deaths
Qing dynasty princesses
People from Beijing
People's Republic of China politicians from Beijing
People of the Republic of China